A local electoral area (LEA) is an electoral area for elections to local authorities in Ireland. All elections use the single transferable vote. The boundaries of LEAs are defined by statutory instrument, usually based lower-level units called electoral divisions (EDs), with a total of 3,440 EDs in the state.

As well as their use for electoral purposes, LEAs are local administrative units in Eurostat NUTS classification. They are used in local numbers of cases of COVID-19.

Municipal districts
A municipal district is a division of a local authority which can exercise certain powers of the local authority. They came into being on 1 June 2014, ten days after the local elections, under the provisions of the Local Government Reform Act 2014. Of the 31 local authorities, 25 are subdivided into municipal districts, which comprise one or more LEA. The exceptions are the three city councils (Cork City, Dublin City and Galway City) and the three county councils in Dublin (Dún Laoghaire–Rathdown, Fingal and South Dublin). A district associated with a city or borough is termed a metropolitan district (ceantar cathrach) or borough district (ceantar buirge) respectively.

In 2019, John Paul Phelan, Minister of State for Local Government and Electoral Reform, commented in the Dáil:
Municipal districts have an extensive list of functions currently, but the situation is haphazard ... some local authorities are better at performing some functions than others. I have found that some local authorities have a strong municipal district structure, with the districts being where most of the nitty-gritty work of local authorities is done, be it roads, footpaths or lights. Some do not have that structure, though, with decisions rehashed or debated again at the councils' plenary sessions.

Boundary changes

Boundaries for local electoral areas and municipal district are determined by statutory instrument of the Minister for Housing, Local Government and Heritage. The Minister must first request the Electoral Commission to prepare a report. The minister must have regard to this report in making any changes.

Prior to the establishment of the Electoral Commission in 2023, recommendations on local electoral boundary changes were made by an independent boundary committee established for that purpose. A boundary committee has been required since 1994 for electoral areas. The 2012–13 Local Electoral Area Boundary Committee considered both administrative areas (municipal districts, though not counties/cities) and electoral areas. In 2015, separate committees were set up to consider adjustments to county and municipal boundaries passing through each of four urban areas: Athlone, Carlow, Drogheda, and Waterford. A Boundary Committee established in 2017 and which reported in June 2018 recommended alterations to municipal districts and local electoral areas which were implemented in December 2018.

Areas
Below are the districts and local electoral areas as defined by the most recent SI in each case and which were used at the 2019 local elections. Unless otherwise specified, districts are titled "Municipal District of Carlow", etc.

See also
Counties of Ireland
Dáil constituencies

References

Council elections in the Republic of Ireland
Electoral areas in the Republic of Ireland
Local government in the Republic of Ireland
Ireland
Subdivisions of the Republic of Ireland
Ireland